Box Emotions is the second studio album by Japanese pop-rock band Superfly, released on September 2, 2009. It debuted at the number-one spot on the Oricon weekly album charts, making Superfly the first female artist in six years, since Chitose Hajime, to have her first two albums debut at the top of the charts. For the Japanese iTunes Store Rewind of 2009, Box Emotions was the album of the year. "Hanky Panky" was sent to radio stations as a promo single, and "Haru no Maboroshi" was sold as an album preview and pre-order bonus on the iTunes Store; it is still available as a separate single through iTunes.

To celebrate the release, Superfly held a free concert at the Roppongi Hills Arena. This was also streamed on Nico Nico Douga. Four-thousand fans showed up, and 1300 were allowed in the concert early.

Track list

Chart history

Oricon Sales Chart

Physical Sales Charts

References

External links
Page for "Box Emotions" at HMV

2009 albums
Superfly (band) albums
Warner Music Japan albums